Events from the year 1612 in France

Incumbents
 Monarch – Louis XIII
Regent: Marie de' Medici

Events

 Starting of Equinoctial France, French colonization efforts around Equator in South America

Births

6 February – Antoine Arnauld, Roman Catholic theologian, philosopher, and mathematician (d. 1694)
10 August – Charles de Grimaldi-Régusse, aristocrat, landowner and politician (d. 1687)

Full date missing

François Byssot de la Rivière (d. 1673)
Louis Ferdinand Elle the Elder, portrait painter (d. 1689)

Deaths

24 January – Honoré du Laurens, archbishop (b. 1554)
1 November – Charles, Count of Soissons, prince du sang and military commander (b. 1566)

Full date missing

 Thomas de Leu, engraver, publisher, and print dealer (b. 1560)

See also

References

1610s in France